In linear algebra, a generalized eigenvector of an  matrix  is a vector which satisfies certain criteria which are more relaxed than those for an (ordinary) eigenvector.

That is, the matrix  may not be diagonalizable. This happens when the algebraic multiplicity of at least one eigenvalue  is greater than its geometric multiplicity (the nullity of the matrix , or the dimension of its nullspace).

The matrix  is also useful in solving the system of linear differential equations  where  need not be diagonalizable.

Overview and definition 
There are several equivalent ways to define an ordinary eigenvector. That is,  is in the kernel of the transformation . If  has  linearly independent eigenvectors, then  is similar to a diagonal matrix . That is, there exists an invertible matrix  such that  is diagonalizable through the similarity transformation . Diagonalizable matrices are of particular interest since matrix functions of them can be computed easily.

On the other hand, if  does not have  linearly independent eigenvectors associated with it, then  is not diagonalizable.

Definition:  A vector  is a generalized eigenvector of rank m of the matrix  and corresponding to the eigenvalue  if

but

 

Clearly, a generalized eigenvector of rank 1 is an ordinary eigenvector. Every  ×  matrix  has  linearly independent generalized eigenvectors associated with it and can be shown to be similar to an "almost diagonal" matrix  in Jordan normal form. That is, there exists an invertible matrix  such that .

That is, the characteristic polynomial  must factor completely into linear factors. For example, if  has real-valued elements, then it may be necessary for the eigenvalues and the components of the eigenvectors to have complex values.

Examples
Here are some examples to illustrate the concept of generalized eigenvectors.  Some of the details will be described later.

Example 1
This example is simple but clearly illustrates the point.  This type of matrix is used frequently in textbooks.
Suppose

Then there is only one eigenvalue, and its algebraic multiplicity is m = 2.

Notice that this matrix is in Jordan normal form but is not diagonal. Hence, this matrix is not diagonalizable. Since there is one superdiagonal entry, there will be one generalized eigenvector of rank greater than 1 (or one could note that the vector space  is of dimension 2, so there can be at most one generalized eigenvector of rank greater than 1).

The ordinary eigenvector  is computed as usual (see the eigenvector page for examples).  Using this eigenvector, we compute the generalized eigenvector   by solving

Writing out the values:

This simplifies to

The element  has no restrictions. The generalized eigenvector of rank 2 is then , where a can have any scalar value.  The choice of a = 0 is usually the simplest.

Note that

so that  is a generalized eigenvector,

Example 2
This example is more complex than Example 1.  Unfortunately, it is a little difficult to construct an interesting example of low order.
The matrix

Together the two chains of generalized eigenvectors span the space of all 5-dimensional column vectors.

Jordan chains 
Definition:  Let  be a generalized eigenvector of rank m corresponding to the matrix  and the eigenvalue .

Thus, in general,

A chain is a linearly independent set of vectors.

Canonical basis 

Definition:  A set of n linearly independent generalized eigenvectors is a canonical basis if it is composed entirely of Jordan chains.

First, find the ranks (matrix ranks) of the matrices .

Now define

Note that

.

Computation of generalized eigenvectors 
In the preceding sections we have seen techniques for obtaining the  linearly independent generalized eigenvectors of a canonical basis for the vector space  associated with an  matrix .  These techniques can be combined into a procedure:

For each 
Determine ;
Determine ;

Example 3 
The matrix

has an eigenvalue  of algebraic multiplicity  and an eigenvalue  of algebraic multiplicity .  We also have .  For  we have .

We now define

Consequently, there will be three linearly independent generalized eigenvectors; one each of ranks 3, 2 and 1.  Since  corresponds to a single chain of three linearly independent generalized eigenvectors, we know that there is a generalized eigenvector  of rank 3 corresponding to  such that

but

Let

Then

and

By choosing , we obtain

Our first choice, however, is the simplest.

and

The simple eigenvalue  can be dealt with using standard techniques and has an ordinary eigenvector

This is a fairly simple example.  In general, the numbers  of linearly independent generalized eigenvectors of rank  will not always be equal.  That is, there may be several chains of different lengths corresponding to a particular eigenvalue.

Generalized modal matrix 

Let  be an n × n matrix.

Jordan normal form 

It can be shown that if the characteristic polynomial  of  factors into linear factors, so that  has the form

All other entries (that is, off the diagonal and superdiagonal) are 0. More precisely,  is a Jordan matrix whose Jordan blocks corresponding to the same eigenvalue are grouped together (but no ordering is imposed among the eigenvalues, nor among the blocks for a given eigenvalue). If  is diagonalizable, then all entries above the diagonal are zero. Note that some textbooks have the ones on the subdiagonal, that is, immediately below the main diagonal instead of on the superdiagonal. The eigenvalues are still on the main diagonal.

(See Note above.)

Example 4 
Find a matrix in Jordan normal form that is similar to

Following the procedures of the previous sections, we find that

and

Designating , we find that

and

Example 5 
In Example 3, we found a canonical basis of linearly independent generalized eigenvectors for a matrix .

so that .

Applications

Matrix functions 

Three of the most fundamental operations which can be performed on square matrices are matrix addition, multiplication by a scalar, and matrix multiplication.  These are exactly those operations necessary for defining a polynomial function of an n × n matrix .  If we recall from basic calculus that many functions can be written as a Maclaurin series, then we can define more general functions of matrices quite easily.  If  is diagonalizable, that is

with

then

(See Matrix function#Jordan decomposition.)

Differential equations 

Consider the problem of solving the system of linear ordinary differential equations

where

  and  

In this case, the general solution is given by

In the general case, we try to diagonalize  and reduce the system to a system like as follows. Substituting , equation takes the form , or

where

The system  has the form

The solution  is then obtained using the relation.

Lemma: Given the following chain of generalized eigenvector of length r as:

These functions solve the system of equations: 

Proof: let define the following sum:

Then:

on the other hand we have:

as required.

Notes

References 
 

 
 
 
 
 
 
 
 
 
 

Linear algebra
Matrix theory